A sundial cannon, sundial gun, noon cannon or meridian cannon, also noonday gun is a device consisting of a sundial incorporating a cannon with a fuse that is lit by an overhanging lens, concentrating the rays of the sun, and causing the cannon to fire at noon, when properly oriented along a north–south axis. The cannon sizes ranged from large to small depending on the location of their use. The household variety was used in estates to signal the time for the midday meal. Larger sizes were used in European parks to signal noon. 

The cannons were used by European royalty in the 18th century. Cannons of this type are exhibited at the National Maritime Museum in Greenwich. The Hamilton Watch Company has a sundial cannon manufactured by Rousseau of Paris ca. 1650. The Rousseau cannon is mounted on a marble sundial and is made of brass. The Sultan of Morocco also owns one that was manufactured by Baker & Sons of London.

History 
The earliest sundial cannons were used in Europe in the 1600s. They were also used in European parks during the 18th and early 19th centuries. The cannon-lens combination was mounted on a sundial. Sundial guns were also used in ships to mark noon. Miniaturized toy versions of the guns were sold in 1979 as unassembled kits by Dixie Gun Works.

Operation 

The gun and the linear ignition groove of the fuse were aligned on a north–south axis, parallel to the one of the sundial, while the lens concentrated the sun rays on the fuse when the sun was directly above. Subsequently, the burning fuse ignited the powder placed in the barrel of the cannon. The lens was mounted on an adjustable frame, which enabled its position to be changed depending on the season. During winter, in December for example, for the small brass cannon manufactured by Rousseau of Paris, the lens had to be lowered by four inches, compared to its position in June as the position of the sun in the sky is lower in winter than during the summer. 

In naval operations, the gun had to be mounted on a rotating base because its orientation had to be in the north–south direction. The directional axis of the gun was determined using the ship's compass. In such operation, the gun was frequently referred to as the "noonday gun" because it fired at noon. This practice became obsolete when the ship chronometer was invented. The use of the sundial cannon was subsequently confined to substandard ships.

Benjamin Franklin

Benjamin Franklin wrote the following review about the cannons in Poor Richard's Almanack:

Popular Mechanics

In a section of the July 1911 issue of Popular Mechanics titled "Women 'Insurgents' in the Farming Business" the writer comments regarding the picture to the right:

In literature 
A sundial gun is mentioned in Ellery Queen's Mystery Magazine.

See also 

 Noon Gun
 Noonday Gun

References 

Artillery
Sundials